Aurelio Buso (active c. 1520) was an Italian painter from Crema. He studied under Polidoro da Caravaggio and Maturino da Firenze, and assisted them in several of their works at Rome. He ornamented the palace of the noble family of Benzoni at Venice with friezes and other works in the style of Polidoro.

Sources

People from Crema, Lombardy
Italian Renaissance painters
Year of death unknown
Year of birth unknown
16th-century Italian painters
Italian male painters